Wright Cyclone was the name given to a family of air-cooled radial piston engines designed by the Wright Aeronautical Corporation and used in numerous American aircraft in the 1930s and 1940s.

Background
The Wright Aeronautical Corporation was formed in 1919, initially to develop liquid-cooled Hispano-Suiza V8 engines under license. The Corporation's first original design, the R1, was also the first successful high-powered radial in the USA. Funded by contracts from the US Navy for new air-cooled radials, Wright started a new design (initially called the P2) in 1924. The resignation of Frederick Rentschler to form the Pratt & Whitney Aircraft Company, along with several key engineering personnel, seriously affected the development of the P2 and it did not go into production.

Cyclone family

R-1300 Cyclone 7

R-1750 Cyclone 9

A new design was launched in 1926, known as the R-1750 Cyclone. This was a nine-cylinder radial with a displacement of 1750 cu in and internally cooled exhaust valves. It was type-tested at 500 hp in 1927.

R-1820 Cyclone 9

In 1932, the R-1750 was developed to a capacity of 1823 cu in. This was the F model Cyclone, designated R-1820. This engine introduced a forged aluminum crankcase and was developed through the 1930s to reach 890 hp. It used a General Electric supercharger, and Wright concluded that this feature limited the potential power output of the engine. For the next development, the G-Series of 1937, Wright developed its own single-speed supercharger. The G-series was developed to deliver 1200 hp at 2500 rpm and made up the bulk of R-1820 Cyclone production during World War 2. It was installed in the Boeing B-17 Flying Fortress. The final phase of development of the single-row radial design was the H-Series at 1350 hp. A licensed, metricated variant was developed as the Shvetsov M-25.

R-2600 Cyclone 14 (Twin Cyclone)

Wright went on to develop two-row engines with 14 cylinders in two rows of seven, called the Cyclone 14, R-2600. This was installed in the Boeing 314, Grumman TBM/TBF Avenger, North American B-25 Mitchell, and some models of the Douglas A-20 Havoc (RAF Boston).

R-3350 Cyclone 18 (Duplex Cyclone)

The penultimate Cyclone development was the 18-cylinder engine R-3350, named the Duplex Cyclone or Cyclone 18. Among other applications, it was installed in the Boeing B-29 Superfortress, Douglas A-1 Skyraider, Lockheed P-2 Neptune, and Lockheed C-121 Constellation. In commercial applications it stayed in production until 1957.

R-4090 Cyclone 22

An experimental 22-cylinder two-row radial intended to compete with the large Pratt & Whitney radial engines. Three prototypes are known to have been built, but development was abandoned to allow resources to be used for the R-3350 development program.

See also
 Pratt & Whitney Wasp series – a comparable competing line of engines

References

Aircraft air-cooled radial piston engines
1920s aircraft piston engines
Cyclone series